The following Confederate States Army units and commanders fought in the Battle of Fort Stedman on March 25, 1865. The Union order of battle is listed separately.

Abbreviations used

Military rank
 Gen = General
 LTG = Lieutenant General
 MG = Major General
 BG = Brigadier General
 Col = Colonel
 Ltc = Lieutenant Colonel
 Maj = Major
 Cpt = Captain
 Lt = Lieutenant

Other
 w = wounded
 mw = mortally wounded
 k = killed

Second Corps, Army of Northern Virginia

MG John B. Gordon

Fourth Corps

Reserve

Notes

References
 Wyrick, William C. "Bursting of the Storm: Action at Petersburg, March 25, 1865", in Blue & Gray, Volume XXVIII, number 5. ISSN 0741-2207.

American Civil War orders of battle